Wayenberg is a surname. Notable people with the surname include: 

Dirk Wayenberg (1955–2007), Belgian racing cyclist
Frank Wayenberg (1898–1975), American baseball player